Adam Peška (born 8 April 1997) was a competitor for Czech Republic at the 2020 Summer Paralympics. In his Paralympic debut he won gold in Boccia at the 2020 Summer Paralympics. He has Duchenne muscular dystrophy.

Peška won the International Paralympic Committee’s Best Male Debut Athlete at the 2021 Paralympic Sport Awards. 

Peška is currently ranked 1st in the BC3 male individual rankings.

References 

1997 births
Living people
Paralympic gold medalists for the Czech Republic
Medalists at the 2020 Summer Paralympics
Paralympic boccia players of Czech Republic
Paralympic medalists for the Czech Republic
Boccia players at the 2020 Summer Paralympics
People with muscular dystrophy